The No. 108 Wireless Set was a wireless radio transceiver used by the Australian Army during the Second World War. The unit was based on the Wireless Set No. 18 and was modified during its production forming 3 different variants: Mk1, Mk2 and Mk3.

See also
 Army No. 208 Wireless Set

External links
https://web.archive.org/web/20120316004408/http://www.vk2bv.org/museum/ws108.htm
http://www.qsl.net/vk2dym/radio/N0.108.htm

World War II Australian electronics
Military equipment of the Australian Army
Military radio systems